Plattsburgh (also spelled "Plattsburg") is an unincorporated community in central Harmony Township, Clark County, Ohio, United States.  It is located along State Route 54 near the headwaters of the North Fork Little Miami River.

Plattsburgh is part of the Springfield, Ohio Metropolitan Statistical Area.

History
Plattsburgh was platted in 1852. A post office was established at Plattsburgh in 1867, and remained in operation until 1968.

References

Unincorporated communities in Clark County, Ohio
Unincorporated communities in Ohio
1852 establishments in Ohio
Populated places established in 1852